Bhabat is a town in Notified Area Committee of Zirakpur in district Mohali in state of Punjab in India.

References

Mohali
Villages in Sahibzada Ajit Singh Nagar district